Atlas of AI: Power, Politics, and the Planetary Costs of Artificial Intelligence is a book by Australian academic Kate Crawford. It is based on Crawford's research into the development and labor behind artificial intelligence, as well as AI's impact on the world.

Overview 
The book is mainly concerned with the ethics of artificial intelligence.

Reception 
The book received positive reviews from critics, who singled out its exploration of issues like exploitation of labour and the environment, algorithmic bias, and false claims about AI's ability to recognize human emotion. The book was considered a seminal work by Anais Resseguier of Ethics and AI. It was included on the year end booklists of Financial Times, and New Scientist, and the 2021 Choice Outstanding Academic Titles booklist.

Data scientist and MIT Technology Review editor Karen Hao praised the book's description of the ethical concerns regarding the labor and history behind artificial intelligence.

Sue Halpern of The New York Review commented that she felt the book shined a light on "dehumanizing extractive practices", a sentiment which was echoed by Michael Spezio of Science. Virginia Dignum of Nature positively compared the book's exploration of artificial intelligence to The Alignment Problem by Brian Christian.

References 

2021 non-fiction books
Systems theory books
Software development books
Computer science books
English non-fiction books
English-language books
Books about the politics of science
Sustainability books
Artificial intelligence publications
Yale University Press books